Night Rehearsal is a 1983 Hungarian comedy film directed by Miklós Szurdi. It was entered into the 13th Moscow International Film Festival.

Cast
 Sándor Szakácsi as Horkai Ádám
 Dorottya Udvaros as Andrea
 György Linka as Gál Szabó Endre
 Zsuzsa Töreky as Ica
 Enikő Eszenyi as Kati
 Tamás Végvári as Theatre Director
 Emese Balogh as Baba
 Erika Bodnár as Erika
 Kati Egri as Kriszta
 Márta Egri as Vajda Ági
 Athina Papadimitriu as Edit

References

External links
 

1983 films
1983 comedy films
Hungarian satirical films
Hungarian comedy films
1980s Hungarian-language films
1980s satirical films